Joseph Lucien Laurent Laplante (March 3, 1934 – March 15, 2017) was a Canadian journalist, essayist and detective writer. He is the author of 20 books.

Early life
Laurent Laplante was born in 1934 in Verdun, Quebec, Canada. He studied literature, history, philosophy and government.

Career
Laplante taught at Université Laval. He became a journalist for Le Devoir, L’Action, Le Jour, Le Droit and Le Soleil. He was also a television and radio presenter, an essayist and the author of 20 books, including detective fiction. He was a member of the Union des écrivaines et des écrivains québécois.

Laplante won the 1996 Olivar-Asselin Award for his defense of the French language in Quebec through his journalism. He also received the Genève-Montréal Award for his essay Pour en finir avec l’olympisme in 1998, and the Saint-Pacôme Award for his detective novel Des clés en trop, un doigt en moins in 2002.

Death
Laplante died of pancreatic cancer on March 15, 2017, in Lévis, Quebec. He was 83.

Works

Essays

Detective novels

References

1934 births
2017 deaths
People from Verdun, Quebec
Writers from Montreal
Academic staff of Université Laval
Journalists from Montreal
Canadian male journalists
Canadian male essayists
Canadian mystery writers
Deaths from pancreatic cancer
Deaths from cancer in Quebec
Canadian male novelists
20th-century Canadian essayists
20th-century Canadian male writers
21st-century Canadian essayists
21st-century Canadian novelists
21st-century Canadian male writers
Canadian novelists in French
Canadian non-fiction writers in French